As of 26 June 2017, 835 players have made an appearance for the British and Irish Lions, a rugby union team selected from players eligible for any of the Home Nations – the national sides of England, Ireland, Scotland and Wales. The Lions generally select international players, but they can pick uncapped players available to any one of the four unions. Despite the Lions team name only being used officially since 1950, tours since 1910 by combined teams have been undertaken with the support of the four home unions, and these along with other tours since 1888 by combined teams have been recognised retrospectively as Lions tours. Eligible players in these tours are included in this list.

Unlike the majority of international sides, who will only recognise people that have participated in test matches against international opposition, the Lions consider an appearance for the team against any opposition sufficient to be recognised as a Lions player. This includes players who have appeared as a replacement during a Lions match, but not those who have only been named as part of a Lions touring squad or included as part of a match day squad as a replacement and not participated in a match.

Ceremonial caps were presented for the first time in April 2018 to all players who had featured for the Lions up to that point. The caps were sent out to all 419 living players, and to the next-of-kin for the remaining 416 players that had represented the Lions up to this point.

The numbers are assigned in order of each player's first appearance. Where two or more players make their first appearance simultaneously (for example at the start of a match, or where multiple replacements take to the field at the same time), numbers are assigned in alphabetical order by surname.

List

Notes

References

 
British and Irish Lions